Perfect War Forever is an EP by metalcore band Glass Cloud.  It was released on October 22, 2013 through Equal Vision Records. It was tracked in part at Eleven18 Studios (Now Flagship Studios) in Hampton Roads.

Some letters on the album cover are in red while some are just white. When connected, the red letters spell out the phrase: “fear forever”.

Track listing

Personnel
Glass Cloud
Jerry Roush - vocals
Joshua Travis – guitar
Travis Sykes – bass, backing vocals
Chad Hasty – drums

References

2013 EPs
Glass Cloud albums
Equal Vision Records albums
Metalcore EPs
Progressive metal EPs